
Świebodzin County is a unit of territorial administration and local government (powiat) in Lubusz Voivodeship, western Poland. It came into being on January 1, 1999, as a result of the Polish local government reforms passed in 1998.

As of 2019 its total population is 55,753, out of which the population of Świebodzin is 21,736, that of Zbąszynek is 5,020, and the rural population is 28,997.

Neighbouring counties
Świebodzin County is bordered by Międzyrzecz County to the north, Nowy Tomyśl County to the east, Zielona Góra County to the south, Krosno Odrzańskie County to the south-west and Sulęcin County to the north-west.

Administrative division
The county is subdivided into six gminas (two urban-rural and four rural). These are listed in the following table, in descending order of population.

References

 
Land counties of Lubusz Voivodeship